Nice is a photo-sharing mobile app in China from Nice App Mobile Technology Co., Ltd. (北京极赞科技有限公司 ) It is similar to Instagram, but also has a feature where users can tag images in specific locations on the image, which makes the app ideal for sharing fashion photos and tagging what brand each item is (for example, tagging a shirt, pants, shoes and belt separately).

The company received a $36 million investment in C-round funding in 2014.

Nice had 30 million registered users and 12 million active users as of late 2015.

Official website
Official website

References

Companies based in Beijing
Image-sharing websites
Mobile applications